Streatham Cemetery is a cemetery on Garratt Lane in Tooting, London; it is one of three cemeteries managed by Lambeth London Borough Council, the others being West Norwood Cemetery and Lambeth Cemetery. Both Streatham and Lambeth Cemeteries are located within the London Borough of Wandsworth.

History
Under the Metropolitan Burial Act of 1852, which followed the second cholera epidemic of 1848–49, the Streatham Burial Board acquired the land for a cemetery in what was countryside at the time. The cemetery opened for burials in 1894 and was provided with two lodges and two mirror-image chapels built in the Gothic style by William Newton Dunn. The cemetery was subjected to extensive "lawn conversion" from 1969 to 1991 and many monuments were removed. No new graves are available in the cemetery but burial in existing family plots is allowed.

The cemetery has a large number of burials of casualties from World War I (218) and World War II (167) which are maintained by the Commonwealth War Graves Commission.

Notable burials
 Sir Wyke Bayliss (1835–1906), artist, author and poet
 Edward Foster VC (1886–1946), recipient of the Victoria Cross during World War I
 Frederick Hackwood (1851–1926), antiquarian
 Jan Kwapiński (1885–1964), Polish independence activist and politician
 Jane Roberts ( 1819–1914), First Lady of Liberia
 Charlie Wilson (1932–1990), one of the gang who committed the Great Train Robbery of 1963

References

External links
 Streatham Cemetery on Find a Grave
 Streatham Cemetery on London Cemeteries

Cemeteries in London
Parks and open spaces in the London Borough of Wandsworth
Anglican cemeteries in the United Kingdom
Burials at Streatham Cemetery
1894 establishments in England
Gothic Revival architecture in London
History of the London Borough of Lambeth
Commonwealth War Graves Commission cemeteries in England
Streatham